Archie Brain (born 2 July 1942) is a British anaesthetist best known as the inventor of the laryngeal mask. The LMA has been used over 300 million times worldwide in elective anaesthesia and emergency airway management.

Biography

Brain returned to the UK in April 1980 and took up a post as a lecturer at the Royal London Hospital under Professor Jimmy Payne.  He set out to determine the electromagnetic field strength required to block the action potential along a nerve. This involved encircling a frog nerve-muscle preparation with an electromagnetic coil. In 1982, he had his first publication: a letter to the editor suggesting that alcuronium should be used instead of succinylcholine for "crash" induction.

Brain submitted patent applications for 12 new devices, including one to assist venepuncture, one to prevent obstruction of anaesthetic trolleys by cables, one to apply a specific amount of cricoid pressure, and even a rotating bed for use in intensive care to prevent bed-sores. The laryngeal mask, LMA Classic was his 13th patent application and was granted in 1982. The LMA Classic was sold by LMA International NV, a company sold to Teleflex Inc in 2012 for $276m.

References

Further reading
Joseph R. Brimacombe, Laryngeal Mask Airway: Principles and Practice, Second Edition, Saunders, 2005. 

British inventors
20th-century British medical doctors
1942 births
Living people